Paul Chauvet was a French cyclist. He was 7th place in the 1905 Tour de France, 8th in the 1905 Paris–Roubaix, and 14th in the 1908 Tour de France.

References

Year of birth missing
Year of death missing
French male cyclists